ZenQuest Martial Arts Center, formerly called the Okinawan Karate School, is a martial arts school located in Lenox, Massachusetts. The oldest martial arts school in Berkshire County, it was founded in 1972 as a dojo for Uechi-ryu karate. The school since expanded to include other martial arts, and currently provides instruction in Shohei-ryu karate (a spin-off of Uechi-ryu), Brazilian jiu-jitsu, mixed martial arts, Muay Thai, boxing, wrestling, kobudo, and self-defense, and is the fastest growing martial arts community in Berkshire County. The school also contains a store which provides equipment, gear, and instructional media. It is affiliated with the Okinawan Karatedo Association, Demian Maia Jiu-Jitsu Association, and Team Sityodtong Boston, and is accredited by the North American Grappling Association. ZenQuest has received significant coverage by regional and local media in Berkshire County, including The Berkshire Eagle, Berkshires' Best Buys, Business, and Beyond, and Pittsfield Cable Television, for its regular youth tournaments and seminars with high-ranking officials from the school's parent organizations.

History

The school was originally based in Pittsfield, Massachusetts, and was opened on Lyman Street in 1972 by Sensei Frank Gorman, who according to Berkshires' Best Buys Business & Beyond introduced Uechi-ryu karate to Berkshire County. It is the oldest martial arts school in Berkshire County. In 1993 the school was moved to the Pittsfield Plaza on West Housatonic Street, developing a significant children's program. Senseis Mark and Connie Flynn took ownership of the school in August 2002. They previously lived and worked in Albany, New York, and ran a smaller satellite dojo in Guilderland. The Flynns purchased the school from Bob and Lisken Dus, who stated at the time that they were entering into retirement and would focus on providing support to the Flynns. In the fall of 2002, the Flynns widened the school's curriculum to include Brazilian "Gracie" jiu-jitsu. Mixed martial arts classes were added later. The Flynns traveled to Okinawa, Japan, in 2003, 2007 and 2012 for training with world leaders in Uechi-Ryu/Shohei-Ryu. During the 2007 trip Mrs. Flynn was promoted to 5th Dan, and both attended the 2007 All Okinawa Championships, a worldwide championship event. Sensei Connie took third place in kata, while Sensei Mark managed to reach fourth in kumite. In 2010, due to deterioration of the Pittsfield Plaza where it was located, and the need for additional space, the school relocated to Lenox Commons in Lenox, where it changed its name from Okinawan Karate School to ZenQuest Martial Arts Center. Along with this relocation and name change the school updated classes to a full roster which includes Muay Thai kickboxing, boxing, wrestling and mixed martial arts. The school is now the largest martial arts community in Berkshire County. In 2016, Mark Flynn received a belt-belt in Brazilian jiu-jitsu, becoming the third person in Berkshire County to achieve that high a rank in the art and the second in the United States to be awarded a black belt by Demian Maia.

Events and seminars
The school has received regular coverage by The Berkshire Eagle and Pittsfield Cable Television, including the school's annual hosting of a youth tournament and black belt promotions, and in 2002 was noted for helping a teen overcome disabilities.

In 2005, the dojo made the headline story in The Berkshire Eagle for hosting a special camp called “Tokkun 2005” at Cross Athletic Center at Miss Hall's School. The camp featured visiting karate masters from Okinawa, specifically Senseis Shigeru Takamiyagi (9 dan), Toshio Higa (8 dan), Hirokuni Yamashiro (7 dan), and Sakae Uechi (5 dan), and in addition to local students in Berkshire County had additional students from more distant areas such as Florida, New Jersey, Michigan, New York, Vermont, and Cape Cod. Another event that received attention from The Berkshire Eagle was a visit from mixed martial arts and jiu-jitsu legend Royce Gracie, who held a clinic at the dojo in 2009. The year before, 2008, another jiu-jitsu clinic had been held with Robert “Crush” Kahn. Several seminars are held every year with notable members from the Okinawan Karate-do Association and Sityodtong Muay Thai. After ZenQuest left the Royce Gracie Jiu-Jitsu network and joined Demian Maia's organization, Demian Maia held a seminar at the school on November 2, 2012, garnering attention from The Berkshire Eagle.

Affiliation and associated schools
ZenQuest Martial Arts Center is a member of the Okinawan Karatedo Association, which is located in Okinawa and is the worldwide governing body for Shohei-ryu karate, and Team Sityodtong, a Muay Thai training camp based in Somerville, Massachusetts. The dojo was also an affiliate of the Gracie Jiu-Jitsu Network, but the termination of its association with the Network was announced on February 2, 2012. On February 18, the dojo announced that its jiu-jitsu program would be under Demian Maia. The school is accredited by the North American Grappling Association. ZenQuest maintains an affiliation with Mike Torres' Torres Advanced Combat Systems classes taught at the Quest Karate and Pace Karate schools in New Jersey.

Competitions

Karate

2007 All-Okinawa Championships
In 2007, Senseis Mark and Connie Flynn competed in the 2007 All-Okinawa Championships in Okinawa, which featured competitors from throughout the world. The results for the Flynns were as follows:

Battle for Boston 2012
On April 22, 2012, ZenQuest competed in the Battle for Boston karate open tournament at Tufts University in Medford, Massachusetts, five miles from Boston. The win was as follows:

Grappling
ZenQuest Martial Arts center has participated in numerous grappling competitions, the following is a list of wins captured by the school.

Rhode Island, 2010
On October 16, 2010, On June 4, 2011, students from ZenQuest Martial Arts Center competed in the 2011 NAGA East Coast Championship in Lincoln, Rhode Island. The school took several wins, which are listed as follows:

Rhode Island, 2011
On January 29, ZenQuest students competed in the NAGA New England Championship in Lincoln, Rhode Island. The school's win is as follows:

Springfield, 2011
On June 4, 2011, students from ZenQuest Martial Arts Center competed in the 2011 NAGA East Coast Championship in Springfield, Massachusetts. The school took several wins, which are listed as follows:

Hartford, 2011
On July 30, 2011, students from ZenQuest competed in the NAGA Hartford event in Hartford, Connecticut. The school's wins are as follows:

Northeast Championship, 2011
On October 15, 2011, students from ZenQuest competed in the NAGA Northeast Championship. The results are as follows:

Rhode Island, 2012
On January 28, 2012, ZenQuest returned to Lincoln, Rhode Island for the New England Championship. Wins are as follows:

Albany, 2012
On March 10, 2012, ZenQuest competed at Albany, New York. The schools wins are as follows:

East Coast 2012
On May 5, 2012, ZenQuest competed at NAGA East Coast Championship in West Warwick, Rhode Island.

Schenectady, 2012
On September 8, 2012, ZenQuest competed at NAGA New York in Schenectady, New York.

New England Championship 2013
On January 26–27, 2013, ZenQuest competed at the New England Championship in West Warwick, Rhode Island.

Albany, 2013
On March 16, 2013, ZenQuest competed at the NAGA Albany in Albany, New York.

Manchester, 2013
On April 6, 2013, ZenQuest competed at the New England Submission Challenge in Manchester, Connecticut.

Plymouth, 2013
On April 20, 2013, ZenQuest competed at the North American Pankration and Grappling Association Pankration Championships at Plymouth, Massachusetts. Their wins are as follows:

East Coast 2013
On May 4, 2013, ZenQuest competed at the NAGA East Coast Championship in Danbury, Connecticut.

References

External links 
 Official webpage
 Primary Facebook
 Secondary Facebook

Companies established in 1972
Privately held companies based in Massachusetts
Schools in Berkshire County, Massachusetts
Karate training facilities
Brazilian jiu-jitsu training facilities
Mixed martial arts training facilities
1972 establishments in Massachusetts